Torkan (also Romanized as Torkān) is a village in Alamut-e Bala Rural District, Rudbar-e Alamut District, Qazvin County, Qazvin Province, Iran. At the 2006 census, its population was 60, in 19 families.

References 

Populated places in Qazvin County